Carlos Ramírez Ruiz (born 24 February 1962) is a Mexican politician from the Institutional Revolutionary Party. In 2009 he served as Deputy of the LX Legislature of the Mexican Congress representing Sinaloa.

References

1962 births
Living people
Politicians from Sinaloa
Institutional Revolutionary Party politicians
21st-century Mexican politicians
Deputies of the LX Legislature of Mexico
Members of the Chamber of Deputies (Mexico) for Sinaloa